Ellerton may refer to:

Places 
Ellerton, Barbados
Ellerton, East Riding of Yorkshire, England
Ellerton, a deserted medieval village in the parish of Ellerton Abbey, North Yorkshire, England
Ellerton-on-Swale, North Yorkshire, England
Ellerton, Shropshire, England

People 
Edward Ellerton (1770–1851), English cleric
John Ellerton (1826–1893), English hymnwriter
John Lodge Ellerton (1801–1873), English composer
Nerida Ellerton (born 1942), Australian mathematics educator
Walter Ellerton (1870–1948), British naval officer

See also 
Ellerton Priory (disambiguation)